The 19th Critics' Choice Awards were presented on January 16, 2014 at the Barker Hangar at the Santa Monica Airport, honoring the finest achievements of 2013 filmmaking. The ceremony was broadcast on The CW and hosted by Aisha Tyler. The nominees were announced on December 16, 2013.

Winners and nominees

Joel Siegel Award
Forest Whitaker

Louis XIII Genius Award
Richard Linklater, Julie Delpy, and Ethan Hawke – The Before Trilogy (Before Sunrise, Before Sunset, and Before Midnight)

Statistics

References

External links
 19th Annual Critics' Choice Movie Awards Nominations at Critics Choice Association
 19th Annual Critics' Choice Movie Awards (2014) – Best Picture: 12 Years a Slave at Critics Choice Association

Broadcast Film Critics Association Awards
2013 film awards